A naval academy provides education for prospective naval officers.

List of naval academies

See also 
 Military academy

 
Naval lists